The Philatelic and Numismatic Office of the Vatican City State, managed by Poste Vaticane, is responsible for issuing Vatican postal stamps and Vatican coins. 

The office was created on 11 February 1929 in the nations founding, and issued the first of the nations postal stamps on 1 August of the same year. While Vatican stamps may only be used within the Vatican City State and the quantity of euro coins is limited by treaty with Italy (the total value of all coins minted in 2002 was restricted to €310,400), Vatican coins and stamps serve as an important sign of Vatican sovereignty, and their scarcity and design makes them popular with collectors.  

Public interest in Vatican currency and stamps was considered sufficient to justify a Philatelic and Numismatic Museum (Il Museo Filatelico e Numismatico) which has been opened as part of the Vatican Museums in 2007. Two special stamps about the museum were issued at the museum opening.

Euro coins issued by the Vatican are minted by Italy's Istituto Poligrafico e Zecca dello Stato (Italian State Mint).

In 2017, the Vatican honored the 500th anniversary of Protestant Reformation by issuing stamps featuring Martin Luther.

See also
 Postage stamps and postal history of Vatican City
 Poste Vaticane
 Vatican euro coins
 Vatican lira
 List of mints
 Index of Vatican City-related articles
 Outline of Vatican City

References

External links

 Vatican Philatelic and Numismatic Office
 Vatican Philatelic Society
 Map of the location of the Philatelic and Numismatic Museum

1929 establishments in Vatican City
Communications in Vatican City
Vatican
Vatican
Philately of Italy
Currencies of Vatican City